AERES, the Agence d'évaluation de la recherche et de l'enseignement supérieur, is a French academic research evaluation agency. AERES was set up as a result of a 2006 law relating to research, and has the task of "evaluating research and higher education institutions, research organisations, research units, higher education programmes and degrees and with approving their staff evaluation procedures".

The Italian ANVUR agency was partly modelled on AERES.

References

External links
Official website. (English language version)
 

Research institutes in France
Education in France
2007 establishments in France
Organizations based in Paris
Research management